Talorc son of Aniel was a king of the Picts from 452 to 456.

The Pictish Chronicle king lists have him reign for four or two years between Drest son of Erp and his brother Nechtan.

References
 Anderson, Alan Orr, Early Sources of Scottish History A.D 500–1286, volume 1. Reprinted with corrections. Paul Watkins, Stamford, 1990.

External links
Pictish Chronicle

456 deaths
Pictish monarchs
5th-century Scottish monarchs
6th-century Scottish monarchs
Year of birth unknown